"Errrbody" is a single by American rapper Yo Gotti, released on July 10, 2014, by Epic Records. The song is about Gotti talking about mainstream rappers being similar to one another, and pretending to be who they aren't despite their status. "Errrbody" peaked at numbers 29 and 98 on the Billboard Hot R&B/Hip-Hop Songs and Hot 100 charts respectively. It was certified Gold by the Recording Industry Association of America (RIAA), denoting sales of over 500,000 units in the United States. An accompanying music video for the single, directed by Benny Boom, follows a group of suburban kids getting involved with street life and finding it not for them the hard way. An official remix of the song was released in October 2014 and featured Lil Wayne and Ludacris.

Composition
The song was produced by Nonstop Da Hitman, featuring "icy synth and tightrope tense hi-hats". It sees Yo Gotti rapping about how rappers in the music industry are acting similarly and pretending to be what they are not, whether it be being rich, "from the hood", or a drug dealer.

Music video
A music video for the song was released on August 12, 2014. Directed by Benny Boom, it follows a group of suburban kids becoming involved in "thug life", and finding out the hard way that it is not for them.

Remix
The official remix of the song was released on October 6, 2014, featuring rappers Lil Wayne and Ludacris. Wayne's verse has been considered reminiscent to that of his "mixtape days", and was praised by Yo Gotti, who called it a "classic Lil Wayne verse".

Charts

Certifications

References

2014 singles
2014 songs
Epic Records singles
Music videos directed by Benny Boom
Songs written by Yo Gotti
Yo Gotti songs